Fowler Township is one of the twenty-four townships of Trumbull County, Ohio, United States.  The 2000 census found 2,733 people in the township.

Geography
Located in the eastern part of the county, it borders the following townships:
Johnston Township - north
Vernon Township - northeast corner
Hartford Township - east
Brookfield Township - southeast corner
Vienna Township - south
Howland Township - southwest corner
Bazetta Township - west
Mecca Township - northwest corner

Part of the city of Cortland is located in northwestern Fowler Township, and the unincorporated community of Fowler lies at the center of the township.

Name and history
Fowler Township is named for Samuel Fowler, an early landowner. It is the only Fowler Township statewide.

Government
The township is governed by a three-member board of trustees, who are elected in November of odd-numbered years to a four-year term beginning on the following January 1. Two are elected in the year after the presidential election and one is elected in the year before it. There is also an elected township fiscal officer, who serves a four-year term beginning on April 1 of the year after the election, which is held in November of the year before the presidential election. Vacancies in the fiscal officership or on the board of trustees are filled by the remaining trustees.

References

External links
County website

Townships in Trumbull County, Ohio
Townships in Ohio